Li Rui (born 2 May 1994) is a Chinese footballer who plays for Nanjing City.

Club career
Li Rui started his professional football career in 2014 when he was signed by Campeonato de Portugal side 1º de Dezembro. He scored first senior goal on 30 November 2014, in a 2–0 away win against Sintrense.  Li scored three goals in 17 appearances in the 2014–2015 season. Li transferred to LigaPro side Aves in the summer of 2015. He made his debut for Aves on 8 August 2015, in a 1–0 home defeat against Covilhã, coming on for Ernest Nyarko in the 67th minute. He was loaned to Campeonato de Portugal club Oliveirense in September 2015.

Li transferred to Primeira Liga side Braga on 8 January 2016. He was loaned to LigaPro side Académica de Coimbra on 8 August 2016. He made his debut for Académica on 25 September 2016, in the second round of 2016–17 Taça de Portugal against Gouveia, coming on as a substitute for Rui Miguel in the 61st minute. On 30 October 2016, he made his league debut for the club in a 0–0 home draw against Gil Vicente, coming on for Pedro Nuno in the 75th minute. Failing to establish at Académica, Li was loaned to Campeonato de Portugal side Trofense in February 2017.

Li joined Hong Kong Premier League side R&F in August 2017. On 16 September 2017, he made his debut and scored his first goal for the club in a 3–1 away loss against Southern District. He scored twice on 28 October 2017 against Yuen Long, which ensured R&F's first victory of the season. On 18 January 2018, R&F (Hong Kong)'s parent club Guangzhou R&F signed Li to their squad. He was then loaned to R&F (Hong Kong) again for the rest of 2017–18 season. Li returned to Guangzhou R&F in the summer of 2018. On 21 October 2018, he made his debut for Guangzhou R&F in a 2–0 away defeat against Henan Jianye.

Career statistics 
Statistics accurate as of match played 31 December 2021.

References

External links

Li Rui at HKFA

1994 births
Living people
Chinese footballers
Footballers from Huizhou
People from Huiyang
S.C. Braga players
C.D. Aves players
AD Oliveirense players
Associação Académica de Coimbra – O.A.F. players
R&F (Hong Kong) players
Guangzhou City F.C. players
Association football forwards
Chinese Super League players
Liga Portugal 2 players
Segunda Divisão players
Hong Kong Premier League players
Chinese expatriate footballers
Expatriate footballers in Portugal
Chinese expatriate sportspeople in Portugal